Osokino is a rural locality (a selo) in Solikamsky District, Perm Krai, Russia. The population was 127 as of 2010. There are 6 streets.

Geography 
Osokino is located 29 km northeast of Solikamsk (the district's administrative centre) by road.

References 

Rural localities in Solikamsky District